Pierre Pavillon (1612-1670) was a French architect and sculptor.

Biography

Early life
Pierre Pavillon was born on 20 February 1612 in Paris. His father, Henri Pavillon (unknown-1651), was a painter. His mother was Marguerite Guilheme. His brother, Claude Pavillon, was a painter too, and his other brother, Henri Pavillon, was a sculptor. He was trained as an architect in Paris from 1625 to 1630.

Career
As an architect, his work focused on Roman Catholic religious buildings and on hôtel particuliers for the wealthy elite.

He designed the Chapelle des Ursulines, a Roman Catholic chapel on the Rue Mignet listed as a monument historique since 1924. Additionally, he designed the Chapelle Saint Mitre, another Roman Catholic chapel, on the Route d'Eguilles.

He designed the Hôtel de Boisgelin located at 11, rue du Quatre-Septembre and listed since 1964. He also designed the Hôtel de Lestang-Parade located at 18, rue de l'Opéra and listed since 1980. Additionally, he designed the Hôtel de Forbin located at 20 Cours Mirabeau and listed since 1990. He also designed the sculptures in the courtyard of the City Hall in Aix, listed since 1995. Additionally, he designed the Pavillon Vendôme, listed since 1953.

Personal life
He married Madeleine Clemens on 15 February 1638. They had two sons:
Balthazard Pavillon (1648-1729).
Jean Pavillon (1651-unknown).

He married Madeleine Grivet on 18 December 1653. They had three children:
Magdeleine Pavillon (1655-unknown).
Françoise Pavillon (1656-unknown).
François Pavillon (1670-unknown).

He died on 24 November 1670 in Aix-en-Provence.

Legacy
The Rue Pavillon in Aix-en-Provence is named in his honour.

Secondary source
Jean Boyer, Pierre Pavillon (1612-1670): un architecte-sculpteur parisien en Provence (Nobele, 1968).

Gallery

References

1612 births
1670 deaths
Architects from Paris
People from Aix-en-Provence
17th-century French architects
French sculptors
French male sculptors